In My Heart (Chinese: 这一刻，想见你) is a 2020 Malaysian musical romance film. The film tells the story of a boy who gives up on his music dream after his brother went into coma after a tragedy. But soon he meets a girl, and rediscover their passion for music.

It is scheduled to be released on 24 April 2020 in Malaysia. The film features well-known Malaysian Chinese-language classic and pop songs.

Synopsis 
One night, music-loving brothers Ah Le and Ah Yuan break into the school auditorium to play an expensive piano. While they manage to distract the security guard, a serious accident occurs while they are trying to make their escape. Ah Yuan falls into a coma, leaving Ah Le feeling guilty to the point that he stops playing music. When Ah Le later enters university, he make friends with teammates who share the same passion for music. He also met an odd punk girl nicknamed Monster, whom he eventually falls for. Ah Le rediscovers his long-suppressed dreams, but when he decides to confess to Monster, something bad happens between them. How will their story goes?

Cast 
 Charles Tu
 Zen
 Yuan Teng
 Daniel Chezi
 Uriah See
 Huang Yi Fei

Production and release 
The film features Taiwanese actor Charles Tu, Malaysian actor Yuan Teng, singers Zen, Daniel Chezi, Uriah See and veteran singer Huang Yi Fei. It features well-known Malaysian Chinese-language pop and classic songs.

The film was originally supposed to be released in Taiwan and Malaysia on 24 April 2020 simultaneously. However due to Malaysia's response to the COVID-19 situation, it was released only in Taiwan on that day. The film was subsequently released in Singapore on 13 August 2020 and in Malaysia on 24 September 2020.

References 

2020 films
Malaysian romantic musical films